Mount Harper is a deeply eroded Late Proterozoic volcanic complex located  north of Dawson City and  west of Mount Gibben. It oversteps the Harper Fault.

In 1888, William Olgilvie named the mountain in honor of Arthur Harper, recognized as the first man to enter the Yukon country seeking gold.

See also
List of volcanoes in Canada
Volcanism in Canada

References

External links
Mount Harper in the Canadian Mountain Encyclopedia

Volcanoes of Yukon
One-thousanders of Yukon
Proterozoic volcanoes
Shield volcanoes of Canada
Polygenetic shield volcanoes